Season two of Mexico's Next Top Model, the Mexican adaptation of Tyra Banks' America's Next Top Model, aired on Sony Entertainment Television from August to November 2011. The show was hosted by Mexican model Elsa Benítez, with the judging panel of the previous season remaining unchanged.

The prize package for this season included a US$100,000 contract with Shock Modeling management, a cover feature and an editorial spread in Elle magazine, replacing the show's previous magazine, Glamour, and brand new Nissan.

The winner of the competition was 20-year-old Tracy Reuss from Gómez Palacio, Durango.

Cast

Contestants
(Ages stated are at start of contest)

Judges
 Elsa Benítez (host)
 Allan Fis 
 Jo Lance  
 Glenda Reyna

Other cast members
 Óscar Madrazo - creative director

Episodes

Results

 The contestant was eliminated
 The contestant quit the competition
 The contestant was eliminated but allowed to remain in the competition
 The contestant won the competition

Notes

References

External links
 Official Website

Mexico's Next Top Model
2011 Mexican television seasons